Hélène Alarie (born 6 June 1941) was a member of the House of Commons of Canada from 1997 to 2000. By career, she has had work in teaching, government and agriculture.

Born in La Pocatière, Quebec, she was elected in the Louis-Hébert electoral district under the Bloc Québécois party in the 1997 general election, serving in the 36th Canadian Parliament. During her term of office she participated in parliamentary committees relating to agriculture. She was defeated in the 2000 general election by Liberal candidate Hélène Scherrer.

External links
 

1941 births
Living people
Bloc Québécois MPs
Women members of the House of Commons of Canada
French Quebecers
Members of the House of Commons of Canada from Quebec
People from Bas-Saint-Laurent
Women in Quebec politics
20th-century Canadian legislators
20th-century Canadian women politicians
Université Laval alumni